The 80th Separate Arctic Motor Rifle Brigade (80-я отдельная мотострелковая бригада) (Military Unit Number: 34667) is a specialist arctic warfare formation of the Coastal Troops of the Russian Navy formed in 2014.

History 
The brigade was formed on 31 December 2014, and its battle flag presented on 17 January 2015 by the commander of the Northern Fleet, Admiral Vladimir Korolev.  The brigade was formed to be the second specialized arctic brigade in the Arctic, along with its sister unit the 200th Separate Motor Rifle Brigade.

As of 2020, the brigade falls under the command of the specially formed 14th Army Corps, itself part of the Northern Fleet Joint Strategic Command.  The brigade's mission is to patrol the border and protect permanent locations along the Russian-Norwegian Border.  The brigade is based in the village of Alakurtti in the Murmansk Oblast.

Recruits of the new brigade undergo severe psychological, physical, and arctic training and testing.

It took part in the 2022 Russian invasion of Ukraine. It was sent to the Donbas region at the end of June 2022.

Composition 
Many recruits tend to want to join these new "specialist units." The arctic brigades are significantly smaller than the Table of Organization and Equipment of other motor rifle brigades. These brigades also have new arctic equipment.

Two sources in 2017 and 2020 give some of the following units as part of an Arctic motor rifle brigade:

 Brigade Headquarters
 Commandant's Company (HQ Company)
 Communications Battalion
 Electronic Warfare Company
 Reconnaissance Battalion
 1st Arctic Motor Rifle Battalion 
 2nd Arctic Motor Rifle Battalion
 Snipers Company
 Self-Propelled Artillery Battalion 
 Anti-Aircraft Missile Battalion (other Motor Rifle Brigades (MRBs) can have a battalion)
 Engineer Company (other MRBs can have a battalion)
 Logistics Company (see above note)
 Maintenance Battalion
 Medical Company 
 CBRN Protection Company
 UAV Company

Footnotes 

DAvid Axe, Russia's Reindeer Brigade is fighting for its survival in Southern Ukraine, Forbes, 7 October 2022

Military units and formations established in 2014
Mechanised infantry brigades of Russia